Perkūnas (Old Prussian: Perkūns, Perkunos, Yotvingian: Parkuns, Latgalian: Pārkiuņs)  was the common Baltic god of thunder, and the second most important deity in the Baltic pantheon after Dievas. In both Lithuanian and Latvian mythology, he is documented as the god of sky, thunder, lightning, storms, rain, fire, war, law, order, fertility, mountains, and oak trees.

Etymology

The name continues PIE *, cognate to *, a word for "oak", "fir" or "wooded mountain". The Proto-Baltic name *Perkūnas can be reconstructed with certainty. Slavic Perun is a related god, but not an etymologically precise match.  Finnish Perkele, a name of Ukko, is considered a loan from Baltic.

Another connection is that of terpikeraunos, an epithet of Zeus meaning "who enjoys lightning".

Perkūnas in written sources
Most information about Perkūnas comes from folklore songs, legends, and fairy tales. Because most of them were collected rather late in the 19th century, they represent only some fragments of the whole mythology. Lithuanian Perkūnas has many alternative onomatopoeic names, like Dundulis, Dindutis, Dūdų senis, Tarškulis, Tarškutis, Blizgulis, etc.

The earliest attestation of Perkūnas seems to be in the Russian translation of the Chronicle of John Malalas (1261) where it speaks about the worship of "Перкоунови рекше громоу", and in the Livonian Rhymed Chronicle (around 1290) which mentions the idol Perkūnė.

In the Constitutiones Synodales (1530) Perkūnas is mentioned in a list of gods before the god of hell Pikuls and is identified with the Roman Jove (Jupiter). In the Sudovian Book Perkūnas (Parkuns) is mentioned in connection with a ritual involving a goat. In Christian compositions, Perkūnas is a malicious spirit, a demon, as in the Chronicle of John Malalas or in the 15th century writings of Polish chronicler Jan Długosz.

Representation in mythology

Perkūnas is the god of lightning and thunder and storms. In a triad of gods Perkūnas symbolizes the creative forces (including vegetative), courage, success, the top of the world, the sky, rain, thunder, heavenly fire (lightning) and celestial elements, while Potrimpo is involved with the seas, ground, crops, and cereals and Velnias/Patulas, with hell, and death. As a heavenly (atmospheric) deity Perkūnas, apparently, is the assistant and executor of Dievas‘s will. However, Perkūnas tends to surpass Dievas, deus otiosus, because he can be actually seen and has defined mythological functions.

In the Latvian dainas, the functions of Pērkons and Dievs can occasionally merge: Pērkons is called Pērkona tēvs ('Father or God of Thunder') or Dieviņš, a diminutive form of Dievs.

Weapons and vehicle
Perkūnas is pictured as middle-aged, armed with an axe and arrows, riding a two-wheeled chariot harnessed with goats, like Thor or Celtic Taranis.

In other accounts, the thunder god is described as driving a fiery chariot through the skies with swift horses, or riding a fiery horse.

Perkūnas' family relations
In songs about a "heavenly wedding" Saulė (the Sun) cheats on Perkūnas with Mėnulis (the Moon); Perkūnas splits Mėnulis in half with a sword. According to another, more popular, version, Mėnulis cheats on the Sun with Aušrinė (the morning star) just after the wedding, and Perkūnas punishes it. However, it does not learn and repeats the adultery and is punished again every month. Other explanations say it is why the Sun shines during the day and the Moon at night. Though divorced, both want to see their daughter Žemyna (the Earth).

In other songs Perkūnas, on the way to the wedding of Aušra (dawn; the daughter of the Sun), strikes a golden oak. The oak is a tree of the thunder god in the Baltic mythology. Lithuanian Perkūno ąžuolas or  Latvian Pērkona ozols ("oak of Perkūnas") is mentioned in a source dated to the first half of the 19th century.

Other myths say that Perkūnas and one Laumė or Vaiva (rainbow) were supposed to get married on Thursday, but the bride was kidnapped by Velnias (the devil) and Perkūnas has hunted Velnias ever since.

Some myths mention four sons of Perkūnas (Latvian: Perkona dēli; Lithuanian: Perkūno sūnūs), who, apparently, are connected with the four seasons or with the four directions of the world (east, west, south and north). Sometimes there are seven or nine Perkūnai referred to as brothers. It is said in Lithuanian "Perkūnų yra daug" ("there are many thunders").

In some myths Perkūnas expels his wife (and in some cases his children too) and remains in the sky by himself. Some myths offer a very different story: Dievas lifts Perkūnas from the earth into the sky. Perkūnas has stones in the sky (which rumble during storms) - the motive connected to Indo-European mythology. Perkūnas dwells on high hills or mountains: compare Lithuanian toponymy of Perkūnkalnis, "mountain of Perkūnas", or Griausmo kalnas, "mountain of rumble."

In most myths, however, Perkūnas's wife is Žemyna.

Perkūnas and Velnias

An important function of Perkūnas is to fight Velnias (in Latvian, Velns). He is sometimes considered the antithesis of Perkūnas and is the god of the underworld and death. Christianity considers "Velnias" akin to their "devil", though this is not in line with ancient beliefs.

Perkūnas pursues his opponent, Velns, for picaroon or theft of fertility and cattle. Velnias hides in trees, under stones, or turns into various animals: a black cat, dog, pig, goat, lamb, pike, cow (compare to the Latvian representations of jods a creature with the cow hoofs) or a person.

Perkūnas pursues an opponent in the sky on a chariot, made from stone and fire (Lithuanian ugnies ratai). Sometimes the chariot is made from red iron. It is harnessed by a pair (less often four or three) of red and white (or black and white) horses (sometimes goats). Compare the Lithuanian deity of horses and chariots Ratainyčia (Ratainicza mentioned in Lasick‘s works; from Lithuanian ratai - "wheel"). It is a mythologized image of a chariot of Didieji Grįžulo Ratai ("Grand Wheels of Grįžulas" (Ursa Major). It agrees with Samogitian representations, in which Perkūnas is a horseman on a fiery horse. On his heavenly chariot Perkūnas appears in the shape of a gray-haired old man with a big beard of many colors, in white and black clothes, holding a goat on a cord in one hand and a horn or an axe in the other.

Perkūnas possesses many weapons. They include an axe or sledgehammer, stones, a sword, lightning bolts, a bow and arrows, a club, and an iron or fiery knife. Perkūnas is the creator of the weapons (Akmeninis kalvis, "the stone smith") or he is helped by the heavenly smith Televelis (Kalvelis).

An opponent of Perkūnas hides itself in the hollow of a tree or a stone (attributes of Perkūnas). The culmination of Perkūnas' hunt for his opponent is a thunder-storm; it not only clears the ground of evil spirits, but returns the stolen cattle or weapons.

Perkūnas is also connected to Thursday. Thursday is the day of the Thunderer in many traditions: compare Polabian Peräune-dǻn ("day of Perun"), Lithuanian Perkūno diena. Perkūnas is associated with the Roman god Jupiter in early sources. Thursday is a day of thunder-storms and rains, and also of weddings.

Prussian Perkūns

Simon Grunau (around 1520) describes a Prussian banner with Perkūns on it. The god is represented as an angry middle aged man with a twisted black beard, topped with a flame. It stands between young Patrimpas and old Patulas. Perkūns maintains the same central position in the description of the sacred oak in Romowe sanctuary. In front of the oak, the eternal fire (symbol of Perkūns) was burned. Special priests served at the sanctuary. Old Prussians would try to appeal to the god by prayers. Perkunatete was the mother of Perkūns.

Latvian Pērkons

Pērkons was strongly associated with Dievs, though the two were clearly different. The people sacrificed black calves, goats, and roosters to Pērkons, especially during droughts. The surrounding peoples came to these sacrifices to eat and drink together, after pouring beer onto the ground or into the fire for him. The Latvians also sacrificed cooked food before meals to Pērkons, in order to prevent thunderstorms, during which honeycombs were placed into fires to disperse the clouds.

Pērkons' family included sons that symbolized various aspects of thunderstorms (such as thunder, lightning, lightning strikes) and daughters that symbolized various kinds of rain.

Pērkons appeared on a golden horse, wielding a sword, iron club, golden whip and a knife.  Ancient Latvians wore tiny axes on their clothing in his honor.

In modern culture
Perkunas is occasionally mentioned in the novels of Harry Turtledove. He provides an important macguffin in The Case of the Toxic Spell Dump (1993) and is the patron god of one of the armies in Gunpowder Empire (2003).

Günter Grass, in his second novel Dog Years (1963), alludes to Perkūnas ("Perkunos") as a symbol of the dark human energies unleashed by the rise of Nazism in Germany in the 1930s.

The fictional parallel to Nazi Germany in the 1966 alternate history novel The Gate of Time by Philip José Farmer is called Perkunisha, named after Perkūnas.

The Lithuanian folk music group Kūlgrinda released a 2003 album titled Perkūno Giesmės, meaning "Hymns of Perkūnas".

See also
Hercynian Forest
Indra
Perkwunos
Perun
Thunaer

References

Further reading
  Nijolė Laurinkienė. Senovės lietuvių dievas Perkūnas (Perkūnas - The God of Ancient Lithuanians). Lietuvos literatūros ir tautosakos institutas: 1996, Vilnius. 
 Lajoye, Patrice. (2018). The Storm God and the Hunter: A Fragment of an Old Balto-Slavic Epos?Le Dieu de l'orage et le chasseur: un fragment d'une ancienne épopée. Studia mythologica Slavica. 21. 27. 10.3986/sms.v21i0.7064.
 Tuite, Kevin. (2004). Lightning, Sacrifice, and Possession in the Traditional Religions of the Caucasus. Anthropos: International Review of Anthropology and Linguistics. 99.
 Tuite, Kevin. “Lightning, Sacrifice, and Possession in the Traditional Religions of the Caucasus (Continued from Anthropos 99.2004: 143-159).” Anthropos, vol. 99, no. 2, 2004, pp. 481–497. JSTOR, www.jstor.org/stable/40466394. Accessed 28 Apr. 2020.

External links

 ausis.gf.vu.lt
 crwflags.com
 lituanus.org
 druidry.org

Baltic gods
Sky and weather gods
Thunder gods
Rain deities
Lithuanian gods
Latvian gods
Prussian gods
Jovian deities